United Nations Security Council resolution 757 was adopted on 30 May 1992. After reaffirming resolutions 713 (1991), 721 (1991), 724 (1991), 727 (1992), 740 (1992) 743 (1992), 749 (1992) and 752 (1992), the Council condemned the failure of the authorities in the Federal Republic of Yugoslavia (Serbia and Montenegro) to implement Resolution 752.

After demanding the Croatian Army respect the article 4 of the Resolution 752, the Council stated that all states should abide by the following rules, until Resolution 752 had been implemented. It demanded that all Member States should:

(a) prevent the import of all products and commodities from Yugoslavia or any activities by their nationals to promote such exports;
(b) prevent the sale of all products and commodities to Yugoslavia, except for humanitarian need;
(c) not make available any commercial, industrial, or public utility, funds or financial resources to Yugoslavia;
(d) deny permission to aircraft to take off from, land or overfly their territory if it is destined to land or has arrived from Yugoslavia, except on humanitarian grounds;
(e) prohibit the maintenance servicing or engineering of aircraft in or operated by Yugoslavia;
(f) reduce the level of diplomatic and consular staff in Yugoslavia;
(g) prevent the participation of persons and teams representing Yugoslavia in sporting events hosted on their territory;
(h) suspend scientific, technical and cultural exchanges and visits.

The Council further decided that the sanctions should not apply to the United Nations Protection Force, the Conference on Yugoslavia or European Community Monitoring Mission. It also called for a security zone to be established in Sarajevo and its airport, further calling on the security council committee established in Resolution 724 should monitor the arms embargo, and that the council as a whole will keep the situation under review.

Resolution 757 was adopted by 13 votes to none against, with two abstentions from China and Zimbabwe.

Sports sanctions
The Yugoslavia football team won qualifying Group 4 for the Euro 1992 finals in June but was disqualified under the UN sanctions; group 4 runner-up Denmark replaced Yugoslavia at the finals and won the tournament.

The resolution came just before the start of the 1992 Summer Olympics, and the International Olympic Committee reached a compromise with the UN whereby the Yugoslav Olympic Committee was not invited to the games but Yugoslav athletes were permitted to compete under the label Independent Olympic Participants, and likewise at the 1992 Summer Paralympics as Independent Paralympic Participants.

See also
 Breakup of Yugoslavia
 Bosnian War
 Croatian War of Independence
 List of United Nations Security Council Resolutions 701 to 800 (1991–1993)
 Slovenian Independence War
 Yugoslav Wars
 Sanctions against Yugoslavia

References

External links
 
Text of the Resolution at undocs.org

 0757
 0757
1992 in Yugoslavia
1992 in Bosnia and Herzegovina
United Nations Security Council sanctions regimes
 0757
Sanctions against Yugoslavia
1992 in sports
Sport in Yugoslavia
May 1992 events